Luís Manuel Braga Dias (born 3 January 1987 in Penafiel) is a Portuguese professional footballer who plays for Lusitânia F.C. as a right back.

External links

1987 births
Living people
People from Penafiel
Portuguese footballers
Association football defenders
Primeira Liga players
Liga Portugal 2 players
Segunda Divisão players
F.C. Penafiel players
F.C. Arouca players
C.D. Santa Clara players
Lusitânia F.C. players
Portugal youth international footballers
Sportspeople from Porto District